Obolenskoye is the name of several rural localities in Kaluga Oblast, Russia:
Obolenskoye, Maloyaroslavetsky District, Kaluga Oblast, a selo in Maloyaroslavetsky District
Obolenskoye, Zhukovsky District, Kaluga Oblast, a selo in Zhukovsky District